Nososticta coelestina is an Australian species of damselfly in the family Platycnemididae,
commonly known as the green-blue threadtail.

Its usual habitat is near rivers and streams. The adult is a medium-sized damselfly with a length of 35 to 40mm, and wingspan similar to its length. The thorax is black with vivid greenish-blue markings in the male, and pale brown in the female.  The abdomen is dark with pale narrow bands between abdominal segments. The wings are tinted with yellow or lemon. In Australia, the distribution is in suitable habitat in the north and eastern part of the continent from the top end of the Northern Territory to central Queensland. The taxon has been assessed in the IUCN Red List as being of Least Concern.

Gallery

See also
 List of Odonata species of Australia

References 

Platycnemididae
Odonata of Australia
Insects of Australia
Endemic fauna of Australia
Taxa named by Robert John Tillyard
Insects described in 1906
Damselflies